André Bernard (born 17 November 1935) is a French modern pentathlete. He competed at the 1960 Summer Olympics.

References

External links
 

1935 births
Living people
French male modern pentathletes
Olympic modern pentathletes of France
Modern pentathletes at the 1960 Summer Olympics
Sportspeople from Lille
20th-century French people